The Tunisian Cup, officially named the President's Cup, is the official competition of the Cup in Tunisian football and is considered the second most important local title after the Tunisian Ligue Professionnelle 1. The first cup competition was held in the 1922–1923 season during the French occupation. The first final was played after independence in the season of 1955 - 1956 and won by Stade Tunisien. The tournament has been held annually since then except for the 1978 season due to the participation of the national team in the World Cup Argentina, and did not complete in 2002 due to the participation of the national team in the World Cup Japan and South Korea. The final match has been held since 2001 at the Olympic Stadium of Rades. A new Tunisian Cup Trophy is adopted whenever a team triumphs the same Trophy three times.

In August 2019, it was announced that future editions would be named in honour of late Presidents of Tunisia and  political activists.

Finals Table

 The lists of finals are shown in the following tables:

Finals before independence

Finals after independence

Performances

Performance by club

References

External links

 RSSSF
 Tunisia Cup - Hailoosport.com (Arabic)
 Tunisia Cup - Hailoosport.com

Finals
Tunisia
Cup